The Central Organising Committee, Communist Party of India (Marxist–Leninist) was a communist party led by Umadhar Singh, active in the early 1980s. The party was briefly represented in the Bihar Legislative Assembly.

Background
Umadhar Singh had been a member of Satyanarayan Singh's CPI(ML), before founding his own party. Singh's influence extended over the Hayaghat and Darbhanga areas of Bihar.

1985 election and merger into COI(ML)
Singh contested the March 1985 election, and won the Hayaghat seat in the Bihar Legislative Assembly. Soon after the election, Singh's party merged into the Communist Organisation of India (Marxist–Leninist).

References

1985 disestablishments in India
Defunct communist parties in India
Political parties disestablished in 1985
Political parties with year of establishment missing